Chioides zilpa, the zilpa longtail, is a species of dicot skipper in the butterfly family Hesperiidae. It is found in Central America, North America, and South America.

References

Further reading

 
 

Eudaminae
Articles created by Qbugbot